Souhad Ghazouani (born 7 August 1982) is a French powerlifter born with paraplegia. She started lifting weights at age six. At the 2004 Summer Paralympics she won silver and in that same year was made a Knight of the National Order of Merit. At the 2008 Summer Paralympics she won a bronze. At the 2012 Summer Paralympics she won gold at the 67.5 kg. She also has a world record in her discipline. She is also a wheelchair racer.

She won the bronze medal in the women's 73 kg event at the 2020 Summer Paralympics held in Tokyo, Japan.

References

External links 
 
 

1982 births
Living people
Paralympic powerlifters of France
Paralympic gold medalists for France
Paralympic silver medalists for France
Paralympic bronze medalists for France
Paralympic medalists in powerlifting
Powerlifters at the 2004 Summer Paralympics
Powerlifters at the 2008 Summer Paralympics
Powerlifters at the 2012 Summer Paralympics
Powerlifters at the 2020 Summer Paralympics
Medalists at the 2004 Summer Paralympics
Medalists at the 2008 Summer Paralympics
Medalists at the 2012 Summer Paralympics
Medalists at the 2020 Summer Paralympics
21st-century French women